Convention and Exhibition Center is a metro station on Line 1 and Line 4 of the Zhengzhou Metro.

Station layout  
The station is a 3-level underground station with two island platforms. The station concourse is on the B1 level and levels B2 and B3 is for the platforms.

Exits

Surroundings 
 ZZICEC (郑州国际会展中心)
 Zhengzhou Greenland Plaza (绿地中心·千玺广场)
 Dennis Midtown 7 (丹尼斯7天地)

References 

Stations of Zhengzhou Metro
Line 1, Zhengzhou Metro
Line 4, Zhengzhou Metro
Railway stations in China opened in 2013